Jørgen Plaetner (1930-2002) was a Danish electronic composer. His works were performed at the Statens Museum for Kunst in 1963.

Works
Album Electronic Music on Da Capo Records
Beta
Modulations
Nocturne
The Lovers
Figures in Water
Hieronymus Bosch
Sonata for Tape Recorder
Alpha

References

1930 births
2002 deaths